Chittoor mandal is one of the 66 mandals in Chittoor district of the state of Andhra Pradesh in India. Its headquarters are located at Chittoor. The mandal is bounded by Yadamari, Gudipala, Thavanampalle, Puthalapattu, Penumuru, Gangadhara Nellore mandals.

Demographics 

 census, the mandal had a population of 212,816. The total population constitute, 106,211 males and 106,605 females —a sex ratio of 996 females per 1000 males. 20,533 children are in the age group of 0–6 years, of which 10,781 are boys and 9,752 are girls —a ratio of 905 per 1000. The average literacy rate stands at 83.02% with 159,641 literates.

Towns and villages 

Mangasamudram (Rural) is the most populated settlement and Krishnapuram is the least populated settlement in the mandal.  census, the mandal has 31 settlements, that includes:

Sources:
 Census India 2011 (sub districts)
 Revenue Department of AP

See also 
Chittoor district

References

Mandals in Chittoor district